Instituts d'études politiques, or IEPs, are ten publicly owned institutions of higher learning in France. They are located in Aix-en-Provence, Bordeaux, Grenoble, Lille, Lyon, Paris, Rennes, Strasbourg and Toulouse, and since 2014 Saint-Germain-en-Laye. Their vocation is the study and research of contemporary political science. All students at the IEPs study a curriculum that is highly practical and broadbased, focusing on the full range of the social sciences across law, economics, finance, and management. These schools are considered as some of the most selective in France, mainly because they are the place where many political and business leaders are trained.

These establishments are more known under the name of Sciences Po, followed by the name of the city where they are located (for example Sciences Po Bordeaux). The epithet Sciences Po without precision of place indicates the IEP Paris. The Paris Institute is referred to as simply the Sciences Po because it is the school after which all other IEPs in France were modelled from the inception of the IEP system by Charles de Gaulle in 1945, apart from Strasbourg, which was created by the same law but with the status of an internal institute of the Robert Schuman University.

According to article 2 of an 18 December 1989 decree, their mission is:
 to contribute to the training of higher civil servants as well as executives in the public, para-public and private sectors, notably in the State and decentralized communities
 to develop the research in political and administrative sciences

The Sciences Po approach and style inspired many universities in France but also abroad. The most famous example the London School of Economics, founded on the model of the Ecole Libre des Sciences Politiques.

Grande École System 

Sciences Po institutes are Grandes Écoles, a French institution of higher education that is separate from, but parallel and connected to the main framework of the French public university system. Similar to the Ivy League in the United States, Oxbridge in the UK, and C9 League in China, Grandes Écoles are elite academic institutions that admit students through an extremely competitive process. Alums go on to occupy elite positions within government, administration, and corporate firms in France.

Although they are more expensive than public universities in France, Grandes Écoles typically have much smaller class sizes and student bodies, and many of their programs are taught in English. International internships, study abroad opportunities, and close ties with government and the corporate world are a hallmark of the Grandes Écoles. Many of the top ranked schools in Europe are members of the Conférence des Grandes Écoles (CGE), as are the Sciences Po institutions. Degrees from Sciences Po are accredited by the Conférence des Grandes Écoles and awarded by the Ministry of National Education (France).

List
The ten Instituts d'études politiques are:

Institut d'études politiques d'Aix-en-Provence
Institut d'études politiques de Bordeaux
Institut d'études politiques de Grenoble
Institut d'études politiques de Lille
Institut d'études politiques de Lyon
Institut d'études politiques de Rennes
Institut d'études politiques de Paris
Institut d'études politiques de Saint-Germain-en-Laye
Institut d'études politiques de Strasbourg
Institut d'études politiques de Toulouse

The other Instituts d'études politiques around the world are :
Institut d'études politiques de Madagascar

Critérium
Every year an inter-IEP competition is held, hosted by the hometown of one of the IEPs and attended by participants from all 10 IEPs. The first crit, as it is known colloquially, was created in 1987 by the IEPs of Bordeaux and Toulouse who decided to have a friendly rugby match.

This competition takes the form of a 3-day sports event and party, and is held over the last weekend of March, run by the host university's "Sports office". The hosting of an event generally costs about 200,000 euros, funded by the participants, as well as by sponsors and grants. The hosting of the event is rotated between the different IEPs each year.

Hosts

 1987: IEP de Bordeaux
 1988: IEP d'Aix-en-Provence
 1989: IEP de Grenoble
 1990: IEP de Toulouse
 1991: IEP de Lyon
 1992: IEP de Paris
 1993: IEP de Strasbourg
 1994: IEP de Lille
 1995: IEP de Rennes
 1996: IEP de Bordeaux
 1997: IEP d'Aix-en-Provence
 1998: IEP de Grenoble
 1999: IEP de Toulouse
 2000: IEP de Lyon
 2001: IEP de Strasbourg
 2002: IEP de Paris
 2003: IEP de Lille
 2004: IEP de Bordeaux
 2005: IEP de Rennes
 2006: IEP d'Aix-en-Provence
 2007: IEP de Grenoble
 2008: IEP de Toulouse
 2009: IEP de Lyon
 2010: IEP de Strasbourg – Choukrit
 2011: IEP de Paris – Monarcrit
 2012: IEP d'Aix-en-Provence – Apéricrit 
 2013: IEP de Bordeaux – Grand Crit classé
 2014: IEP de Rennes (canceled)
 2015: IEP de Grenoble – Les bronzés font du Crit
 2016: IEP de Toulouse
2017: IEP de Lyon – Crit Gone Wild
2018: IEP de Strasbourg – Le Temps de Krithédrales
2019: IEP de Paris – L'Impéracrit
2020: IEP d'Aix-en-Provence – La Goire de mon Crit (canceled)

Traditions
Each of the 10 instituts has a distinctive colour and distinctive symbols and/or mascots:
 Aix-en-Provence. Colours: Red and gold. Mascot: "Pastaga-man" Symbol: An "X", cicadas 
 Toulouse. Colours: Pink and white. Mascot: A pig or hog.
 Bordeaux. Colours: Red and black. Symbol: A bottle of red wine.
 Rennes. Colours: Orange and black. Mascot: A reindeer called "René".
 Paris. Colours: Yellow and black. Symbol: A lion and a fox.
 Lille. Colours: Red and white. Mascot: A giant mussel
 Strasbourg. Colours: Blue and white. Mascot: A stork called "Josy". Nicknamed the "Strohteam".
 Lyon. Colours: Blue and red. Mascot: a lion called "Lyonix".
 Grenoble. Colours: Blue and yellow. Mascot: Big Foot ("le Yéti"). Nicknamed "IKEA" due to their colours.
 Saint-Germain-en-Laye. Colours: Green and black. Symbol: a wolf.

Winners
Paris and Aix-en-Provence are the usual winners of the trophy

 1987: IEP de Bordeaux
 1988: IEP d'Aix-en-Provence
 1989: IEP d'Aix-en-Provence
 1990: —
 1991: —
 1992: IEP d'Aix-en-Provence
 1993: IEP de Bordeaux
 1994: IEP d'Aix-en-Provence
 1995: IEP d'Aix-en-Provence
 1996: IEP de Bordeaux
 1997: IEP d'Aix-en-Provence
 1998: IEP de Paris
 1999: IEP de Toulouse
 2000: IEP de Paris
 2001: IEP de Paris
 2002: IEP de Paris
 2003: IEP de Paris
 2004: IEP de Paris
 2005: IEP de Paris
 2006: IEP d'Aix-en-Provence
 2007: IEP de Grenoble
 2008: IEP de Grenoble
 2009: IEP de Paris
 2010: IEP de Grenoble
 2011: IEP de Paris
 2012: IEP de Paris
 2013: IEP de Paris

References

 
politiques
Political science education
Political science organizations
Public policy schools
Educational institutions in France
Political science in France

de:Institut d'études politiques de Paris